Louangnamtha Airport  is an airport in Laos, 6 km south of the city of Luang Namtha. The airport was closed between 2006 and 2008 for a renovation that extended the runway from 1,200 to 1,600 metres, allowing larger aircraft such as the ATR 72 to use the airport, and built a new 700 m2 passenger terminal.

Airlines and destinations

References

External links 

 Airport information at Great Circle Mapper

Airports in Laos
Airport
Buildings and structures in Luang Namtha province